The Fiat AS.8 was a large Italian 16-cylinder, liquid-cooled V configured aircraft racing engine designed and built in the late-1930s by Fiat for an attempt to capture the air speed record. Another reason for the design was to provide the Regia Aeronautica with high performance fighter aircraft engines. 

Production problems caused the project to be abandoned when Italy entered World War II in June 1940, power for the fighter designs moved to licensed-built Daimler-Benz DB 605 V-12 engines as the Fiat RA.1050.

Design and development
The unusually long crankshaft was supported by nine main bearings to prevent torsional vibration. A propeller speed reduction unit was used to drive contra-rotating propellers.

During dynamometer testing in the early 1940s the engine produced  and ran reliably for over 100 hours, where the AS.6 had been limited to one hour running.

The aircraft suffered damage from air raids and the factory was taken over in 1943 during the German occupation of Italy.

Applications
Fiat C.S.15 (intended)

Specifications

See also

References

Notes

Bibliography

 Montalbano, Giovanni, Il Fiat A.S.8, in Aerofan III Gen.-Mar., Milano, Giorgio Apostolo Editore, 1980.
 Alata, Compiuti 50 anni di costruzioni aeronautiche a Torino, volume XV, 1959.

External links

Restoration of a Fiat AS.8 at the Italian Air Force Museum, Vigna di Valle - www.aisastoryauto.it 

AS.8
1940s aircraft piston engines